The Brihanmumbai Mahanagar Palika election, 2012 (Brihanmumbai Municipal Corporation election, 2012) was an election of members to the Brihanmumbai Municipal Corporation which took place on 16 February 2012.

Result
The ruling Shiv Sena-BJP-Republican Party of India (Athavale) alliance won the elections. Sunil Prabhu was elected Mayor of Mumbai.

See also
 2012 Maharashtra local elections
 Mayor of Mumbai

References
 

Mumbai
2012 elections in India
2010s in Maharashtra
February 2012 events in India
Brihanmumbai Municipal Corporation